The Weber Implement and Automobile Company Building, at 1815 Locust St. in St. Louis, Missouri, was built in 1919.  It was designed by architect Preston J. Bradshaw.  It was listed on the National Register of Historic Places in 2004.

It is a three-story Classical Revival-style building.

It has also been known as Tire Mart Inc..

See also
Old Weber Implement and Automobile Company, also NRHP-listed in St. Louis

References

National Register of Historic Places in St. Louis
Neoclassical architecture in Missouri
Buildings and structures completed in 1919
1919 establishments in Missouri
Buildings and structures in St. Louis